D.A.V Public School Sahibabad is a school in Rajender Nagar, Sahibabad, Ghaziabad, Uttar Pradesh, India. It is part of the Dayanand Anglo-Vedic Schools System in India and Pakistan. D.A.V. stands for faith in the values of Vedic culture and study.

The school is CBSE affiliated. It was established in April 1984 under D.A.V. College Managing Committee, Chitragupta Road, New Delhi with 60 students and 7 teachers. It has about 10,000 students and over 250 staff.

Wings 

Nursery wing

The nursery wing of the school contains Pre-Nursery, Nursery and Prep classes with fully air conditioned class rooms. The kids learn through play methods like songs, stories, audio-visuals, toys, colors, and games. They learn basic skills through games, music, art, stories, films and computers.

Pre-primary wing (grades 1- IV)

The pre-primary wing caters to class I to IV. The curriculum emphasises the children acquiring intellectual, emotional and sensory experiences through various subjects.

Secondary school (grades 8 – 10)

The secondary school wing caters to class VIII to X.

Senior school (grades 11–12)

In senior school, Science, Commerce and Humanities streams are offered. Various combinations of subjects offered are as follows:

 Science: Physics, chemistry, Mathematics, Biology with Computer Science, Physical Education, Home Science
 Commerce: Accounts, Business Studies, Economics with Computer Science, Physical Education, Home Science, Hindi, Music
 Humanities: History, Geography, Political Science, Physical Education, Home Science, Hindi, Music

Facilities 

The school has libraries in the nursery wing and in the main school building. The school has 15,000 books in English and Hindi, on a wide range of subjects. The reading room subscribes to 40 periodicals and journals.

It also has laboratories for physics, chemistry, biology and bio-technology. The school has an art room, medical room and a music room.

Facilities provided to the students include transportation, counselling and special education. The school has their own as well as private contract CNG buses. Counselling is provided for parents and students.

The school has two computer labs for practical work; one is for Classes I to VIII and other is for Classes IX to XII. The school is running computer education as per the guidelines set by C.B.S.E.

Houses 

The school comprises four houses named after various stones: Sapphire, Ruby, Emerald, and Topaz. Each house is assigned a Senior (classes nine to twelve) and Junior (classes six to eight) Housemaster. Each house has a captain (from class 12th) and vice-captain (from class 11th).

References

External links
 Ribblu

Schools in Ghaziabad, Uttar Pradesh